Jiří Holý (27 November 1922 in Ružomberok – 11 November 2009 in Prague) was a Czech actor. He starred in the film Poslední propadne peklu under director Ludvík Ráža in 1982.

Selected filmography
 Horoucí srdce (1963) 
 Lupič Legenda (1972)
 Hroch (1973)
 Tam, kde hnízdí čápi (1975)

References

1922 births
2009 deaths
People from Ružomberok
Czech male actors
Czech male film actors
Czech male voice actors
Czech scenic designers
Czechoslovak male actors
20th-century Czech male actors